The following is a list of all team-to-team transactions that have occurred in the National Hockey League during the 1917–18 NHL season. It lists what team each player has been traded to, signed by, or claimed by, and for which player(s), if applicable.

Rights retained
Note: This is the list of players who were retained by their teams after the NHA disbanded and the NHL was created.

Dispersal Drafts
Note: This is the list of players who were selected in the dispersal drafts when the Quebec Bulldogs opted not to play the season and the Montreal Wanderers left the league after their home arena burned down.

Free agency

Trades between teams

References

 
 

Transactions
National Hockey League transactions